The Jiangjunding Formation is a geological formation in Shandong, China whose strata date back to the Campanian-Maastrichtian stages of the Late Cretaceous. Dinosaur remains are among the fossils that have been recovered from the group.

The Jiangjunding formation consists purpley-grey or reddy-brown sandstones or various consistencies, siltstones and conglomerates. The Jiangjunding Formation was deposited in a fluvial to lacustrine environment. The climate was warm and humid during the majority of the timespan, although it was beginning to dry out after the Jiangjunding.

Paleofauna 
Dinosaur eggs are known from this formation.

Age of the formation 
The Wangshi group of geologic formations is generally considered to be from the Late Cretaceous, although some regions are older. Based on the discovery of Pinacosaurus, only known elsewhere in the Djadokhta Formation or regions of the same age, the Wangshi Group was presumed to be a similar age of 75–71 million years old. The specific age for the Hongtuya Formation has been identified as 73.5–72.9 mya. As the Hongtuya is directly older than the Jiangjunding, it was identified that the Jiangjunding must be of latest Campanian to earliest Maastrichtian age, according to Borinder (2015).

References 

Late Cretaceous Asia
Geologic formations of China
Cretaceous China
Paleontology in Shandong